Hannu Mäkirinta (30 April 1949 – 17 February 1989) was a Finnish orienteering competitor. At the 1974 World Orienteering Championships in Silkeborg he finished 16th in the individual event, and received a silver medal in the relay with the Finnish team. In 1976 he finished 15th in the individual event, and received a bronze in the relay.

See also
 Finnish orienteers
 List of orienteers
 List of orienteering events

References

1949 births
1989 deaths
Finnish orienteers
Male orienteers
Foot orienteers
World Orienteering Championships medalists